The 2024 CFL National Draft is a selection of National players by Canadian Football League teams that is scheduled to take place in the spring of 2024. 74 players will be chosen from among eligible players from Canadian Universities across the country, as well as Canadian players playing in the NCAA. That number is subject to change if there are any forfeited selections.

Format changes
As per the 2022 collective bargaining agreement, beginning with this year's draft, the two teams that had National players featured in the highest percentage of snaps played in the 2023 CFL season will each be awarded an additional second-round pick. Because of this change, there will no longer be second-round territorial selections for the two worst teams from the previous season.

Trades
In the explanations below, (D) denotes trades that took place during the draft, while (PD) indicates trades completed pre-draft.

Round two
 Hamilton → Calgary (PD). Hamilton traded this selection, a first-round pick in the 2023 CFL Draft, a third-round pick in the 2023 CFL Draft, and a sixth-round pick in the 2023 CFL Draft to Calgary in exchange for Bo Levi Mitchell, a first-round pick in the 2023 CFL Draft, and a third-round pick in this year's draft.
 Montreal → Edmonton (PD). Montreal traded this selection to Edmonton in exchange for Jesse Gibbon.

Round three
 Calgary → Hamilton (PD). Calgary traded this selection, Bo Levi Mitchell, and a first-round pick in the 2023 CFL Draft to Hamilton in exchange for a second-round pick in this year's draft, a first-round pick in the 2023 CFL Draft, a third-round pick in the 2023 CFL Draft, and a sixth-round pick in the 2023 CFL Draft.

Round four
 BC → Hamilton (PD). BC traded a fourth-round selection to Hamilton in exchange for Dane Evans. The draft pick can be escalated if undisclosed conditions are met.

Conditional trades
 BC → Ottawa (PD). BC traded a conditional fourth-round selection and a third-round pick in the 2023 CFL Draft to Ottawa in exchange for Terry Williams.

References
Trade references

General references

Canadian College Draft
2024 in Canadian football
CFL Draft